Vrh or VRH may refer to:

Places

Croatia 
 Vrh, Istria County
 Vrh (Krk), Primorje-Gorski Kotar County

Montenegro 
 Vrh, Bijelo Polje

Serbia 
 Vrh (Kraljevo)

Slovenia 
 Gorski Vrh, Tolmin
 Kanalski Vrh, Kanal ob Soči
 Planinski Vrh, Šentjur
 Selski Vrh, Šentjur
 Sveta Trojica, Domžale
 Sveti Vrh, Mokronog–Trebelno
 Vrh nad Krašnjo, Lukovica
 Vrh nad Laškim, Laško
 Vrh nad Želimljami, Škofljica
 Vrh pri Boštanju,  Sevnica
 Vrh pri Dolskem, Dol pri Ljubljani
 Vrh pri Fari, Kostel
 Vrh pri Hinjah, Žužemberk
 Vrh pri Križu, Žužemberk
 Vrh pri Ljubnu,Novo Mesto
 Vrh pri Mlinšah, Zagorje ob Savi
 Vrh pri Pahi, Novo Mesto
 Vrh pri Poljanah, Ribnica
 Vrh pri Površju, Krško
 Vrh pri Šentjerneju, Šentjernej
 Vrh pri Sobračah, Ivančna Gorica
 Vrh pri Trebelnem, Mokronog–Trebelno
 Vrh pri Višnji Gori, Ivančna Gorica
 Vrh, Šmarje pri Jelšah, Šmarje pri Jelšah
 Vrh Svetih Treh Kraljev, Logatec
 Vrh, Trebnje, a former settlement

Other uses 
 Nissan VRH engine